Like Totally Weird is a comedy play by William Mastrosimone.

Productions 
Like Totally Weird premiered at the Humana Festival in Louisville Kentucky.

Divadlo J. K. Tyla 
Directed by Martin Vokoun. The play had premiere on 13 December 2008 in J. K. Tyl Theatre in Plzeň. Czech name is Jako naprostý šílenci.
Russ Rigel .... Martin Stránský
Jennifer Barton .... Andrea Černá
Kenny .... Jan Maléř
Jimmy .... Zdeněk Rohlíček

Východočeské divadlo 
Directed by Jiří Seydler. The play had premiere on 28 September 2003 - 14 November 2003 in Eastern Bohemian Theatre in Pardubice. Czech title is Jako naprostí šílenci.
Russ Bigel .... Petr Brychta
Jennifer Barton .... Kristina Jelínková
Kenny .... Tomáš Kolomazník
Jimmy .... Zdeněk Rumpík

Actors Theatre 
Directed by Mladen Kiselov. The play had premiere 10 March 1998 - 4 April 1998 in Actors Theatre of Louisville and 22nd Humana Festival of New American Plays.
Russ Rigel .... Craig Heidenreich
Jennifer Barton .... Kim Rhodes
Kenny .... Kevin Blake
Jimmy .... Chris Stafford
Voice of Chauffeur .... Craig Michael Robillatd

Divadlo Exil 
Directed by Jan Smeták. We can a play watching on 28 February 2009 in Exil Theatre, Pardubice.
Russ Bigel .... Tomáš Klement
Jennifer Barton .... Naďa Kubínková
Kenny .... Ondřej Tichý
Jimmy .... Alexandr Andrej

References

External links 
J. K. Tyl Theatre
Eastern Bohemian Theatre
Actors Theatre

Comedy plays
Plays by William Mastrosimone
2008 plays